William Handcock (1737 – April 1794) was an Irish politician.

He was the only son of Robert Handcock, fifth son of William Handcock, and his wife Jane Blackburne, daughter of Richard Blackburne. Handcock entered the Irish House of Commons in 1759, representing Athlone until 1783.

On 9 October 1767, he married Susannah, second daughter of Owen Lloyd and had by her an only son.

References

1737 births
1794 deaths
Irish MPs 1727–1760
Irish MPs 1761–1768
Irish MPs 1769–1776
Irish MPs 1776–1783
Members of the Parliament of Ireland (pre-1801) for Athlone